Muhammed Necati Şaşmaz (born 15 December 1971) is a Turkish actor, best known for playing the lead role of Polat Alemdar in the popular television series Kurtlar Vadisi (Valley of the Wolves) and its movie spin-offs, including Kurtlar Vadisi Irak (Valley of the Wolves Iraq).

Necati Şaşmaz was born to a family of Zaza origin in Harput, Elazığ, Turkey, as the oldest son of Abdülkadir Şaşmaz. He studied Tourism and Hotel Management, both in Turkey and in Canada. He lived in the United States for six years before returning to Turkey for a visit to his parents.

In Istanbul, Necati Şaşmaz met renowned Turkish director Osman Sınav, who offered him the leading role in the Valley of the Wolves. He played the fictional character Polat Alemdar in the series and in the movie. He currently plays in another spin-off of the original series titled Kurtlar Vadisi: Pusu (Valley of the Wolves: Ambush).

He married Nagehan Kaşıkçı in 2012, but filed for divorce in 2019. Their divorce was finalized in 2021.

Filmography

Cinema 
 2006: Valley of the Wolves: Iraq as Polat Alemdar.
 2011: Valley of the Wolves: Palestine as Polat Alemdar.
 2017: Valley of the Wolves: Homeland as Polat Alemdar

TV 
 2003–2005: Valley of the Wolves as Polat Alemdar.
 2005: Ekmek Teknesi as Polat Alemdar (guest appearances).
 2007 Valley of the Wolves: Terror as Polat Alemdar.
 2007–2016: Valley of the Wolves: Ambush as Polat Alemdar.
 2010: Halil İbrahim Sofrası as Necati Şaşmaz (guest appearances).
 2012: Kurt Kanunu as Ismail Enver (guest appearances).
 2015: Kara Kutu as the producer.
 2020-2021: Eşkıya Dünyaya Hükümdar Olmaz

References

External links
 Necati Şaşmaz Biography 
 Profile of Necati Şaşmaz a.k.a. Polat Alemdar & Murad Alamdar
  
 Necati Şaşmaz at Instagram
 Necati Şaşmaz at Twitter

1971 births
Living people
Zaza people
Turkish male film actors
Turkish male television actors
People from Elazığ
Male actors from Istanbul
21st-century Turkish male actors